Bestayev or Bestaev (Ossetian: Бестаутæ)  is an Ossetian masculine surname, its feminine counterpart is Bestayeva or Bestaeva. 

It may refer to
Alimbeg Bestayev (1936–1988), Russian and Ossetian wrestler 
Anri Bestayev (born 1964), Russian football player (North Ossetia)
Otar Bestaev (born 1991), Kyrgyzstani judoka
Valerian Bestayev (born 1982), Russian football player

Ossetian-language surnames